Marcel Mihalache (born 26 August 1971) is a retired Romanian rugby union football player. He played as a hooker for professional SuperLiga club Steaua București. Mihalache is currently the assistant coach of Steaua.

Career
Marcel Mihalache played his entire career for Steaua București and is considered one of the club's living legends.

Honours
Steaua București
 SuperLiga: 1998/99, 2002/03, 2004/05, 2005/06
 Romanian Cup: 2006, 2007

References

External links

Marcel Mihalache's Profile at ESPN Scrum

1971 births
Living people
Romanian rugby union players
Romania international rugby union players
Romanian rugby union coaches
CSA Steaua București (rugby union) players
Rugby union hookers